Susanne Hahn (née Ritter, born 23 April 1978 in Hildesheim) is a German track and field athlete competing in the Marathon and other long distance running events.

Biography

She competed in the 2008 Summer Olympics in Beijing, finishing the marathon in 52nd place. She also participated in the 2009 and 2007 World Championships in Athletics. In 2012, she was nominated to participate in the Olympic Games in London, where she finished in 32nd place.

Hahn is married to her coach, Frank Hahn.

Since May 2012, the German long-distance runner has been the official ambassador of the SOS Children's Villages and participated in several running events for the aid organization.

References

External links
 

1978 births
Living people
Athletes (track and field) at the 2008 Summer Olympics
Olympic athletes of Germany
Athletes (track and field) at the 2012 Summer Olympics
Sportspeople from Hildesheim
German female long-distance runners
German female marathon runners
21st-century German women
20th-century German women